The Bogeyman is a legendary monster. 

Bogeyman, Boogeyman or Boogie Man may also refer to:

People
The Boogeyman (wrestler) (born 1964), ring name of American professional wrestler Martin Wright
Albert Fish (1870–1936), an American serial killer sometimes referred to as "The Boogeyman"
Derek Boogaard (1982–2011), a Canadian professional hockey player, nicknamed "The Boogeyman" because of his surname

Fictional characters
Bogeyman (Ghostbusters), a fictional character from the TV show The Real Ghostbusters
Michael Myers (Halloween), the killer in the Halloween film series
Pyramid Head, a monster from the video game series Silent Hill, is referred to as the Boogeyman in Silent Hill: Homecoming

Books
"The Boogeyman" (short story), a 1973 short story by Stephen King
The Bogie Man (comics), a comic book series

Film
The Bogeyman (1953 film), a West German comedy film directed by Carl Boese
The Boogeyman (1980 film), a 1980 horror film, released in the United Kingdom as The Bogey Man
Boogeyman II, a 1983 horror film, banned in the United Kingdom, under the title, Revenge of the Bogey Man
Return of the Boogeyman, a 1994 horror film, also known as Boogeyman III
The Boogeyman (2023 film), a 2023 horror film
Boogeyman (film), a 2005 horror film
Boogeyman 2, a 2007 horror film
Boogeyman 3, a 2008 horror film
Boogie Man: The Lee Atwater Story, a 2008 documentary

Television
"Boogeyman" (My Name Is Earl), a 2006 episode
"Boogieman" (Law & Order), a 2008 episode

Music
 "Boogie Man," a song by Sid Phillips
"The Bogey Man" a 1963 song by The Moontrekkers
"The Boogie Man," by The Jackson 5 on their 1973 album Skywriter
"Bogey Man" / "The Bogeyman," a 1976 song by Mike Harding
"Boogie Man" (Aerosmith song), 1993
"Boogie Man" (AC/DC song), 1995
"Bogey Man," a 2000 song by John Entwistle on his album Music from Van-Pires
"Boogieman," a 2016 song by Childish Gambino
"Boogieman Sam," a 2019 song by King Gizzard and the Lizard Wizard
"Boogieman" (Ghali song), 2020

See also

Bogey (disambiguation)
Boogie (disambiguation)